A Little New York Midtown Music is an album by jazz cornetist Nat Adderley recorded in 1978 and released on the Galaxy label.

Reception 

The AllMusic review by Scott Yanow noted "The music is essentially modern hard bop and is as well-played as one would expect from this strong personnel". The Penguin Guide to Jazz criticized the recording quality, but praised the contributions of Adderley, Feldman, and Griffin.

Track listing 
All compositions by Nat Adderley except where noted.

 "Fortune's Child" – 6:17
 "A Little New York Midtown Music" – 7:42
 "Sunshine Sammy" – 7:43
 "Yeehaw Junction" – 5:42
 "Come Rain or Come Shine" (Harold Arlen, Johnny Mercer) – 5:28
 "Whipitup" (Victor Feldman) – 3:26
 "Saguaro" (Ron Carter) – 7:19

Personnel 
Nat Adderley – cornet
Johnny Griffin – tenor saxophone
Victor Feldman – piano, electric piano
Ron Carter – bass
Roy McCurdy – drums

References 

1979 albums
Nat Adderley albums
Albums produced by Orrin Keepnews
Galaxy Records albums